Teengenerate were a Japanese punk rock band from 1993 to 1996, known for their fun style of playing garage punk with a sense of humor and often incomprehensible English lyrics. After disbanding for a time, some of its members (Fifi, Fink and Sammy) went on to start the band Firestarter. At the time of their split, Teengenerate consisted of Fink (guitar, vocals), Fifi (guitar, vocals), Sammy (bass) and Shoe (drums). Their original drummer was called Suck. In 2005, Teengenerate reformed for a series of shows worldwide, gaining new fans and gathering old ones back into the fold. Other past bands that featured Teengenerate members include: Fifi and the Mach III, the Raydios and the Tweezers.  The Teengenerate song "My GTO" was used in the 2000 film, Wild Zero, directed by Tetsuro Takeuchi. The Teengenerate song "My Girl Dressed in Black" was also featured in the 2022 film, "Sam Now", directed by Reed Harkness.

Discography

Albums

Singles
 "Get Me Back" (1993)
 "Sex Cow" (1994) (500 special 'blue vinyl' copies released)
 "I Don't Mind" (1994)
 "Car Crazy !..." (1994)
 "No Time" (1995)
 "Out of Sight" (1995)
 "Flying Over You" (1996)
 "Dressed in Black" (1996)
 "Wild Wild Teengenerate" (1996) (Teengenerate play three songs of the Belgian band The Kids)
 "V.M.Live issue No. 22" (November 2, 1997)

Split singles
 Split with Stepford 5
 Split with American Soul Spiders
 Split with Screaming Bloody Marys (1994)
 Split with Rip Offs (1994)
 Split with Bum

Compilations
 The Estrus Cocktail Companion - "Let's Take Another Booze"
 Pop Goes the Weasel Vol 1. (1994)
 Cheapo Crypt Sampler CD - "Get Me Back" (1994)
 Watch For Me Girl, A Tribute To DMZ (1994)
 Turban Renewal: A Tribute To Sam The Sham & The Pharaohs (1994) (LP version released as well)
 500 Miles To Glory - "My G.T.O." (1995) (Reissued September 9, 1997 with bonus "Picture Disc")
 Oh Canaduh! (August 15, 1996)
 Tokyo Trashville
 The R.A.F.R. Vol. 1 (1995)
 Not So Pretty, (Pretty Things tribute) (1995)
 Searching For Cool (Only 500 copies)
 Skookum Chief Powered Teenage Zit Rock Angst (1995)
 Wild News From The World
 Viva La Vinyl Vol. 2
 Cheapo Crypt Sampler No. 2! (1997)
 Flaming Burnout (1997)
 The Early Ones (1999)
 Certain Damage !

VHS
 Bottle Up & Go!
 Power Ground Video Vol. 2

References

External links
30 November 1995 Interview in L.A.
Grunnen Rocks - Teengenerate
Yahoo Music
VH1

Japanese garage rock groups
Japanese punk rock groups
Garage punk groups
Japanese indie rock groups
Musical groups from Tokyo
Verve Records artists
Sympathy for the Record Industry artists
Musical groups established in 1993
Musical groups disestablished in 1996